The Inter-Valley Conference is an Ohio High School Athletic Association (OHSAA) athletic league made up of 14 schools from Carroll, Coshocton, Holmes, Stark, Guernsey and Tuscarawas counties.

The conference underwent a major change at the start of the 2017–18 season as the league added five new member schools including Indian Valley, Claymont, Tuscarawas Valley, Buckeye Trail and Conotton Valley.

Current members

 Plays concurrently in Ohio Valley Athletic Conference.
 Played 2011-16 in the OVAC (also played concurrently with OVAC 2001-11).
 Wizards in girls' basketball only.
 Played 1977-83 in All-Ohio, 1983-89 in the Senate League, and 1989-2017 in the PAC.

Former IVC members

Sports
The following sports were offered by member schools according to each district's official website. Sandy Valley offered the most opportunities to their students as they supported 18 varsity sports while Claymont offers 17 and Indian Valley and Tuscarawas Central Catholic offer15 each.

Enrollment numbers for members schools (as of 2017–2018 school year)
The following enrollment numbers for members schools provided by the OHSAA as of the 2017-2018 school year.

IVC divisions
For sports where divisions are used, a geographical alignment is used for all sports except football, which aligns along school size. 

Football Divisions

 Conotton Valley plays football in the OVAC, while Hiland does not offer the sport. Sandy Valley opted to play in the Small School division to preserve rivalries,  while Newcomerstown opted to play in the Large division for the same reason.

Showcases
Three sports now host showcases, pitting teams seeded by division records against their counterparts in the opposite division (1 vs. 1, 2 vs. 2, etc.)

League championships

State championships

See also
Ohio High School Athletic Conferences

Ohio high school sports conferences